Oxford High School (OHS) is a public high school in Oxford, Mississippi. It educates 1,210 students in grades nine through twelve. It is part of the Oxford School District.

Its boundary includes almost all of Oxford, the University census-designated place, and some unincorporated areas.

History
High-school students first attended public school in Oxford in 1886 when a building was erected to accommodate twelve grades of students.  The University High School was the primary school in Oxford until 1963 when the town was integrated and the Oxford School District was formed.

As the city of Oxford grew, so did the student population.  A transition to class 5A in 2008 was followed up by a move to 6A, Mississippi's highest classification.  In 2014, Oxford High School relocated and moved into a new $30 million building at 101 Charger Loop, due to the increasing number of students.  The former building, which stood as the high school for nearly half a century, became the middle school for grades 7 and 8 in the district.

Arts
Between 2007 and 2017, the OHS Theatre program was invited five times to the American High School Theater Festival at the Fringe Festival in Edinburgh, Scotland.

Athletics
The Oxford Chargers have won the Mississippi High School Athletic Association's All Sports Award 4A or 5A several years, fulfilling a commitment to being a first-class athletic program.

Sports programs at Oxford High School include baseball, basketball, bowling, cheerleading, cross country, dance, fastpitch softball, football, golf, powerlifting, slowpitch softball, soccer, swimming, tennis, track and field, and volleyball.

On December 7, 2019, the Oxford High School Varsity Football Team won its first state title against Oak Grove. The score was 31 - 21.

Notable alumni
Edward Aschoff, sports reporter
Larry Brown, writer
Sam Kendricks, pole vaulter, 2016 Olympics bronze medalist
Grae Kessinger, shortstop for Ole Miss Rebels baseball and the Houston Astros organization.
DK Metcalf, wide receiver for Ole Miss Rebels football and the Seattle Seahawks
Karlous Miller, comedian
Alex Mullen, world memory champion

References

Further reading

External links 

 
 

Public high schools in Mississippi
Schools in Lafayette County, Mississippi
Buildings and structures in Oxford, Mississippi
Educational institutions established in 1886
1886 establishments in Mississippi